The Detroit Red Wings are a professional ice hockey team based in Detroit, Michigan. They are members of the Atlantic Division in the Eastern Conference of the National Hockey League (NHL) and are one of the Original Six teams of the league. Founded in 1926, the team was known as the Cougars from then until 1930. For the 1930–31 and 1931–32 seasons the team was called the Falcons, and in 1932 changed their name to the Red Wings. The 2021–22 season was the 96th for the Detroit franchise. Since their founding, the Red Wings have won 3,021 regular season games, accumulated 19 division championships and six conference championships, led the league in points 18 times, appeared in the Stanley Cup playoffs 64 times, and won 11 Stanley Cup titles.

Detroit first qualified for the playoffs in 1929 where they lost to the Toronto Maple Leafs 7–2 in total goals scored. In the 38 seasons from 1929 to 1966 the team missed the playoffs only six times. They appeared in the Stanley Cup Finals 18 times during this period, winning the Stanley Cup in seven of those opportunities, with their championships coming in 1936, 1937, 1943, 1950, 1952, 1954, and 1955. Their last Finals appearance of this era came in 1966 when they lost in six games to the Montreal Canadiens. The Red Wings then experienced a period, from 1967 until 1983, when they made the playoffs only twice, winning only one series, beating the Atlanta Flames two games to none in 1978.

The Red Wings returned to the playoffs in 1984 where they suffered a first round defeat to the St. Louis Blues. In the 36 seasons since then they have made the playoffs 30 times, including 25 consecutive seasons from 1991 to 2016 (not counting the cancelled 2004–05 season). They returned to the Finals for the first time since 1966 in 1995 where they were swept by the New Jersey Devils in four games. However, in 1997 they made it back to the Finals, winning the series in four straight games over the Philadelphia Flyers. They repeated as champions in the following season with a four-game sweep of the Washington Capitals. Their most recent championships were in 2002 and 2008, with their most recent Finals appearance in 2009 where they lost to the Pittsburgh Penguins.

Table key

Year by year

Notes
From the 1926–27 season through the 1929–30 season, the Detroit NHL franchise was known as the Cougars.
From the 1926–27 season through the 1937–38 season, the Detroit NHL franchise played in the American Division.
From the 1930–31 season through the 1931–32 season, the Detroit NHL franchise was known as the Falcons.
Since the 1932–33 season, the Detroit NHL franchise has been known as the Red Wings.
From the 1938–39 season through the 1966–67 season, the NHL had no divisions.
Prior to the 1967–68 season, the NHL split into East and West Divisions because of the addition of six expansion teams.
The NHL realigned prior to the 1974–75 season. The Red Wings were placed in the Prince of Wales Conference's Norris Division.
Prior to the 1981–82 season, the NHL moved the Norris Division to the Clarence Campbell Conference.
The NHL realigned into Eastern and Western conferences prior to the 1993–94 season. Detroit was placed in the Central Division of the Western Conference.
The season was shortened to 48 games because of the 1994–95 NHL lockout.
Beginning with the 1999–2000 season, teams received one point for losing a regular-season game in overtime.
The season was cancelled because of the 2004–05 NHL lockout.
Prior to the 2005–06 season, the NHL instituted a penalty shootout for regular-season games that remained tied after a five-minute overtime period, which prevented ties.
The season was shortened to 48 games because of the 2012–13 NHL lockout.
The NHL realigned prior to the 2013–14 season. The Red Wings were placed in the Atlantic Division of the Eastern Conference.
  The 2019–20 NHL season was suspended on March 12, 2020 due to the COVID-19 pandemic.
  The 2020–21 NHL season was shortened due to the COVID-19 pandemic.

References

External links 
 Detroit Red Wings official website

 
National Hockey League team seasons
Detroit Red Wings
seasons